Dictionarium Latinogermanicum was the title of a number of early German dictionaries (Latin-German glossaries):
 Published in 1535 version by Petrus Dasypodius (1495–1559

 Published in 1541 and 1556, by Johannes Frisius (1505–1565)